The Eltanin Fault System (Eltanin Fracture Zone) is a series of six or seven dextral transform faults that offset the Pacific-Antarctic Ridge, a spreading zone between the Pacific Plate and the Antarctic Plate. The affected zone of the Pacific-Antarctic Ridge is about 800 km long, between 56° S, 145° W and 54.5° S, 118.5° W, southwest of Easter Island, and about as far as one can get from land on planet Earth (48°52.6′S 123°23.6′W). However, the total offset is about 1600 km. The two major faults in the Eltanin Fracture Zone are the Heezen Fault and the Tharp Fault.  Others related faults include the Vacquier Transform Fault, the Menard Transform Fault, and the Udintsev Fault.

See also 

 Hollister Ridge

Notes

Further reading
 
 
 
 
 
 
 

Geology of the Southern Ocean
Geology of the Pacific Ocean
Seismic faults
Geology of Antarctica